Geijera parviflora, commonly known as wilga, is a species of shrub or small tree in the family Rutaceae and is endemic to inland parts of eastern Australia. It has drooping branches, linear to narrow lance-shaped leaves, small white flowers in loose panicles and spherical fruit containing a shiny black seed. Other vernacular names include Australian willow, native willow, sheepbush and dogwood.

Description
The leaves give off a strong smell when crushed. The smell of the flowers has been described as foetid, but also as citrus-scented and attracts insects. Flowering occurs from June to November and the fruit is more or less spherical,  in diameter, each containing a single shiny black seed.

Taxonomy
Geijera parviflora was first formally described in 1848 by English botanist John Lindley in Thomas Mitchell's Journal of an Expedition into the Interior of Tropical Australia. The specific epithet parviflora is from the Latin, meaning "small flowers".

Distribution and habitat
Wilga prefers calcareous soils, either red clays or sandy soils, and grows as scattered trees in open woodland or occasionally in stands. It is mainly found in inland New South Wales and Queensland, extending into south-eastern South Australia and is rare in Victoria where it is only known from the north-west of the state, near Kenley.

Uses
Wilga is a useful shade and fodder tree in agricultural areas. Sheep particularly enjoy grazing on the lower branches, although trees appear to vary greatly in palatability (some are eagerly sought after and others ignored). The reason for this variation is unknown, and soil composition is speculated as a cause. Despite being slow growing, it is planted in Australia and overseas as an ornamental. It prefers full sunshine, and can tolerate the occasional light frost and drought. Indigenous Australians chewed the aromatic leaves for alleviating toothache. Regeneration from fresh seed and cuttings has proven to be difficult. It is suggested that the hard seed coat should be cracked, to assist seed germination.

Gallery

References

parviflora
Sapindales of Australia
Flora of New South Wales
Flora of Queensland
Flora of Victoria (Australia)
Flora of South Australia
Plants described in 1848
Taxa named by John Lindley